Ilya Vladislavovich Kamyshev (born 13 July 1997) is a Russian football player who plays as a defensive midfielder for FC Rodina-2 Moscow.

Club career
He made his professional debut in the Russian Professional Football League for FC Chertanovo Moscow on 25 July 2014 in a game against FC Tambov.

He made his Russian Football National League debut for FC Zenit-2 Saint Petersburg on 16 July 2016 in a game against FC Shinnik Yaroslavl.

In July 2019, he returned to FC Chertanovo Moscow.

On 16 October 2020, he joined Russian Premier League club FC Khimki on loan. He made his RPL debut for Khimki on 27 February 2021 in a game against FC Ufa.

On 18 June 2021, he returned to FC Khimki on a permanent basis and signed a 3-year contract with the club. His contract with Khimki was terminated by mutual consent in early January 2023.

Career statistics

References

External links
 
 
 
 Player card at 1fnl.ru

1997 births
People from Novotroitsk
Sportspeople from Orenburg Oblast
Living people
Russian footballers
Russia youth international footballers
Association football midfielders
FC Chertanovo Moscow players
FC Zenit-2 Saint Petersburg players
FC Khimki players
Russian Premier League players
Russian First League players
Russian Second League players